John Lane (November 28, 1818 – April 2, 1890) was an Irish-born political figure. He represented York East in the Legislative Assembly of Ontario as a Liberal member from 1875 to 1879.

He was born in Tipperary, Ireland in 1818 but grew up and was educated in Upper Canada. He married Sarah Barker in 1850. Lane served on the council for York County.

References

External links
 
The Canadian parliamentary companion, 1879, CH Mackintosh

1818 births
1890 deaths
Ontario Liberal Party MPPs
Irish emigrants to pre-Confederation Ontario
People from the Regional Municipality of York
Politicians from County Tipperary
Immigrants to Upper Canada